Astrape and Bronte (Ancient Greek:  ["Astrapē", lit. "Lightning"];  ["Brontē", lit. "Thunder"]) are, in Greek mythology, the goddesses of lightning and thunder. As members of Zeus' entourage, they were his shield bearers, given the task of carrying his thunderbolts along with Pegasus.

Astrape's Roman counterpart is Fulgora.

Philostratus the Elder (3rd century BCE Greek rhetorician), in Imagines 1.14, gave this description: "[From a description of an ancient Greek painting depicting the death of Semele] Bronte (Thunder), stern of face, and Astrape (Lightning), flashing light from her eyes, and raging fire from heaven that has laid hold of a king’s house, suggest the following tale, if it is one you know. A cloud of fire encompassing Thebes breaks into the dwelling of Kadmos as Zeus comes wooing Semele; and Semele apparently is destroyed, but Dionysos is born, by Zeus, so I believe, in the presence of the fire."

In an Apulian vase painting, Astrape stands beside the throne of Zeus bearing the armaments of the sky-god. She also wields a torch and is a crowned with a shining aureole.

Bronte should not be mistaken with Brontes, one of the three Hesiodic Cyclopes who, along with his brothers, Steropes, Arges, Akmonides, Pyrakmon, Euryalos, Elatreus, Trakhios and Halimedes, forged Zeus' thunderbolts.

References

External links 

 ASTRAPE & BRONTE from The Theoi Project

Greek goddesses
Pegasus
Thunder goddesses
Sky and weather goddesses
Personifications of weather
Personifications in Greek mythology